"Glory to Hong Kong" is a march that was composed and written by a musician under the pseudonym "Thomas dgx yhl", with the contribution of a group of Hongkonger netizens from the online forum LIHKG during the 2019–2020 Hong Kong protests. It was initially written in Cantonese and was eventually developed into various language versions starting with English. The song, hailed by protestors as an unofficial "national anthem of Hong Kong", is widely considered as promoting democracy in Hong Kong.

Since widespread protests in Hong Kong erupted in early June 2019, various songs that symbolise democracy, such as "Do You Hear The People Sing" from Les Misérables, have been sung by protesters on different occasions as their anthems. "Glory to Hong Kong", according to the composer, was created "to boost protesters' morale and unite people". Since the song's publication, it has been sung at most demonstrations. There are also numerous versions in English and other languages.

Background
Thomas, a music composer and Cantonese-language lyricist, first posted an instrumental version of "Glory to Hong Kong" and its lyrics on 26 August 2019 to LIHKG, an online forum where pro-democracy Hongkongers exchange views. After receiving suggestions from the forum users, he modified the lyrics, including the incorporation of the phrase "Liberate Hong Kong; revolution of our times", a motto at the protests. The song's music video, comprising scenes from demonstrations, was uploaded to YouTube on 31 August 2019. The song went viral within a few days across various social media, followed by the emergence of versions in English and other languages. An orchestral music video with SATB chorus was uploaded to YouTube on 11 September 2019, reaching 1.5 million views within a week. Hong Kong protesters previously sung "Do You Hear the People Sing?" and "Sing Hallelujah to the Lord" as protest anthems, before adopting "Glory to Hong Kong" as their main anthem.

In an interview with Time magazine, the author-composer said: "Music is a tool for unity, I really felt like we needed a song to unite us and boost our morale. The message to listeners is that despite the unhappiness and uncertainty of our time, Hong Kong people will not surrender." In an interview with Stand News, the composer explained his motivation to compose a new protest song for Hong Kong in place of songs commonly sung during protests such as "Boundless Oceans, Vast Skies" and "Glory Days", two songs by Hong Kong band Beyond, describing the songs as "not unpleasant to listen to", but that their rhythm was somewhat out of place with the atmosphere during protests. The composer said he was predominantly a pop rock artist, noting that a classical-style production like "Glory to Hong Kong" was a personal first. Inspired by "God Save the King", "The Star-Spangled Banner", the national anthem of Russia, the "Battle Hymn of the Republic" and "Gloria in Excelsis Deo" by Antonio Vivaldi, he spent two months composing the song's melody working backwards from the line "" ("Glory to Hong Kong", or loosely translated as "May people reign, proud and free").

The song was observed to have similar connotations to Roman Tam's "Below the Lion Rock", a Cantopop song highly regarded among Hong Kongers in association with the sense of the region's common spirit.

Origin of the title

The word "glory" in the song title consists of the Chinese characters for honour and brilliance. The term has been used in poems by Li Bai and a prose by Lu Xun, in addition to being a common term used by Christians. The composer noted that he was irreligious, and described the last sentence "Glory be to Hong Kong" as his twofold wish: that Hong Kong can regain its glory in the future, and that Hongkongers are willing to dedicate their pride and triumphs to the city.

While this is largely an antiquated term in modern Chinese, it is still in common usage in modern Vietnamese, Japanese (eikō) and Korean.

Lyrics
"Glory to Hong Kong" comprises four stanzas of lyrics in Cantonese. The author states that he prioritised the meaning of the lyrics over the rhyming of lines, and explains the meaning of each stanza as follows:

The first stanza solemnly describes the suppression and deprivation of fundamental human rights, such as democracy, liberty and justice.

The second stanza describes the anti-ELAB movement, where the people stand up to injustice even though blood is shed. The solemness follows that in the first stanza.

The third stanza describes the perseverance of Hong Kong people in darkness and despair. It is performed with slightly less solemn character.

The final stanza, with the most recognisable motto "Liberate Hong Kong; revolution of our times" incorporated in the lyrics, envisages that the city will regain its glory and honour. It expresses hope for the future, ending the song with excitement.

Other languages
Various versions of English lyrics have appeared online. Shek Ga-mak, a Hong Kong expatriate in Germany, released German lyrics for the song on 11 September 2019. Japanese lyrics for the song were also released by an anonymous Japanese person on 18 September 2019. Members of Action Free Hong Kong Montreal performed a French version written by netizen assuming pseudonym "Montreal Guy", which was uploaded to YouTube on 26 September 2019. Pícnic per la República released and sung a Catalan version on 24 October 2019 in front of the Chinese Consulate of Barcelona. A Taiwanese version was premiered by the indie band The Chairman during a solidarity concert in Taipei on 17 November 2019. Stefano Lodola released an Italian version in 2019 on YouTube.

Public use

The song has been sung on numerous occasions by citizens in the public all over the city. 200 people participated in a sit-in at Prince Edward station on 6 September 2019, requesting MTR to hand over footage of the attacks on passengers conducted by police on 31 August; in addition to chanting slogans, the protesters sang this anthem and "Do You Hear the People Sing?". A few hundred people sang the song together at Cityplaza on 9 September. On 10 September, Hong Kong football supporters sang the song at a match for the first time during a FIFA World Cup qualification match against Iran, booing the Chinese anthem. On the same night, the song was again publicly sung by large groups at more than a dozen shopping malls across Hong Kong at 8:31 pm, a reference to both the police attacks on 31 August and the 2014 NPCSC Decision on Hong Kong which was declared on 31 August 2014. On 11 September, around 100 people sang the song together in a memorial meeting for a suicide victim held at Ka Shing Court in Fanling. Around 500 students from 10 secondary schools in Kwun Tong District, Tseung Kwan O and Kowloon City District organised a human chain, in which they sang the song. Around 1000 people sang the song in New Town Plaza together that night, with crowds of people singing the song in other shopping malls around Hong Kong as well.

Reception
Robyn Dixon and Marcus Yam of Los Angeles Times described "Glory to Hong Kong" as having "a more indigenous, electric, unifying effect" when compared to songs that were previously used at the protests. The march's Cantonese lyrics, in particular, affirms a sense of a collective cultural identity which is at the heart of the conflict. The lyrics evokes a sense of pride and belonging to Hong Kongers who struggle for identity after the 1997 hand-over to China. The hymn-like composition was also seen as "supremely approachable" to the populace who were accustomed to the Christian music tradition introduced by the region's British and missionary-influenced educational system.

The Chinese edition of Deutsche Welle named "Glory to Hong Kong" the "anthem" of the Hong Kong protests. The Chinese edition of Voice of America describes the lyrics of the song as reflecting the heartfelt views of protestors. Taiwanese newspaper Liberty Times described the song as "the military march of protesters", singing their anxiety towards Hong Kong's political situation, as well as an "unrelenting revolutionary spirit". Describing the song, Chinese Television System News noted that the song had "peaceful vocals coupled with scenes of bloody conflicts between Hong Kong Police and the people" and that by creating "Glory to Hong Kong", Hongkongers recorded their "history of struggling for democracy and freedom". Chow Po-chung, a professor of politics and public administration at the Chinese University of Hong Kong noted that the song's melody and lyrics resonated with many people and united protesters, leading to many people developing great "attachment" to the song. Former President of the Legislative Council of Hong Kong Jasper Tsang praised the song as a high-quality technical production, believing it to be produced by professional musicians. He said that the song shows that the government's efforts at promotion have been weak.

Wen Wei Po, a state-owned newspaper controlled by the Hong Kong Liaison Office, published an article on its front page on 12 September, criticising the song as the anthem for Hong Kong independence, and that the lyrics idealise violence. The title of the article, "" may be translated as "Independence song brainwashes, touting independence as the route [for Hong Kong]", though "independence" may be treated as a pun for "poison" in this context due to its Chinese pronunciation. Carmen Poon published an article in Ming Pao on 13 September entitled "The brainwashing song that trumpets Hong Kong independence", in which she describes the "elegant lyrics" of the song as "advocating hate", and that "seeds of violence and hatred have been sown into the brainwashing song, causing people to inadvertently dance to its baton and commit bad behaviour".

The song has been described as the unofficial anthem of Hong Kong, and some protesters stated they felt that "Glory to Hong Kong" should replace the Chinese national anthem "March of the Volunteers" as the national anthem of Hong Kong; to which, the composer insisted that the song can only be a protest song: "There is no nation. How can there be a national anthem?" On the other hand, an opinion piece by Brian C. Thompson, a Chinese University of Hong Kong senior lecturer, for The Globe and Mail argues that despite only a "few" minority of the protesters are demanding for a separate state, the march is used as a thematic anthem representing the collective demands of the Hong Kong people – which are also considered "a nation [...]. A state may be home to multiple nations..." – therefore the march can still be regarded as "national" in nature.

The song has gained a huge popularity in Ukraine, as for the result of the song's name and slogan was inspired by the traditional Ukrainian slogan "Слава Україні! Героям слава!" (Glory to Ukraine! Glory to the heroes!) The Hong Kong's slogan version was also used by Ukrainian protesters in solidarity with the Hong Kong protesters.

Authorities' responses
Following the enactment of the Hong Kong national security law in 2020, the Hong Kong government remained unwilling to declare the song illegal, despite deeming some phrases "separatist and subversive", particularly references to the protest chant "Liberate Hong Kong, revolution of our times", which it specifically identified as banned under the controversial legislation. Schools were told not to allow the song to be played or sung.

In practice, public renditions of the song quickly draw attention from the police, and prosecutions are regularly brought on malleable charges such as obstruction, busking without a licence, not wearing a mask, and even 'possession of an offensive weapon' in some toy plastic handcuffs. In September 2022, a harmonica player among the mourners for Queen Elizabeth II outside the British Consulate who played the song, along with "God Save the King" and others, was arrested under an old 'sedition' law.

Controversies 
Anita Lee, a host of Vancouver-based Chinese-language radio station CJVB, received complaints from local Chinese residents after playing "Glory to Hong Kong" live on radio. She rejected rumours that she was suspended, whilst refusing to comment further.

Apple Daily published an article on 15 September, quoting RTHK staff who claimed to have received a notice from their managers on 12 September which told them not to play the song outside of news and phone-in programmes for the needs of "news broadcasting" due to its ties with Hong Kong independence. The article also quoted that the song should be deleted from recordings of shows where previously played, due to an alleged violation of the RTHK Charter which states that RTHK should fulfil the purpose of "engendering a sense of citizenship and national identity through programmes that contribute to the understanding of [Hong Kong's] community and nation". After holding meetings with employees, Director of Broadcasting Leung Ka-wing instead said that the song was to be avoided due to its controversial nature. Responding to the newspaper's enquiry, Ng Man-yee of RTHK responded that its management has not banned "Glory to Hong Kong", has not deleted the song from its database, and as far as she knows, has not discouraged playing the song.

Lai Rifu, a Weiquan dissident, was arrested by Guangzhou police for picking quarrels and provoking trouble on 16 September. On 13 September, Lai had shared a video to WeChat and Facebook, which showed scenery around his home town and used the song as its background music, with the caption "This is my homeland, I want her to be free!" On 18 September, around 20 pro-democracy activists, including Civic Party legislator Kwok Ka-ki, Civil Human Rights Front convener Jimmy Sham and members of the League of Social Democrats rallied to the Hong Kong Liaison Office, demanding the release of Lai. The activists chanted slogans and sang the song outside the Liaison Office's entrance.

Copyright infringement by secondary creations 
On 12 September, a video titled "Glory to Hong Kong (Police Version MV)" appeared on YouTube. It uses the original song and lyrics in audio, paired with scenes of Hong Kong Police using tear gas and other crowd-control weapons on protesters. On the screen, however, the lyrics "Revolution of our Times" were replaced with "Mission of the Police". Since being uploaded, this MV had received criticism from netizens which were removed later that night. Timelapse photographer Francis So condemned the MV on his Facebook page, stating that the timelapse of the night view of Hong Kong near the end of the video infringes his copyright. Cable TV also made a statement regarding clips from i-CABLE News used in the video, saying that they would retain the right to pursue all copyright infringements.

Following this incident, another video titled "May Truth be Bestowed Upon Hong Kong" appeared. It used the instrumentals of "Glory to Hong Kong", but lyrics were rewritten by someone under the pseudonym "a person who loves Hong Kong" to praise the Hong Kong Police Force and to fight against "rioters". Lin Xi made a remark stating that the use of instrumentals from the original "did not give a sense of violation, and was like a match made in heaven". He opined that the problem was the definition of "rioters, whether they were those who abused their power to arrest and beat up people or the powerless force that was attempting to fight back". This MV was reuploaded to Sina Weibo by various Chinese communist official organisations, such as the People's Daily and the Communist Youth League.

On 28 September, the fifth anniversary of the Umbrella Movement, a YouTube channel named "Channel Me" uploaded a video titled "Peace Upon Hong Kong". It was a video spoof of the orchestral MV of "Glory to Hong Kong" by Black Blorchestra. It was also re-uploaded to other social media, including Junius Ho's Facebook page. All uploads of this song were later blocked by Content ID claims by Denise Ho's label Goomusic.

Anthem mix-up gaffes 
A national anthem mix-up incident happened at the 2022 Asia Rugby Sevens Series. The song was played during a rugby match in Incheon, between the Hong Kong and South Korea rugby teams. Asia Rugby apologised and explained that it was down to "simple human error" made by a junior member of staff. The staff saved 'the Hong Kong national anthem' listed on the top of a search engine in the file folder named, 'Hong Kong'. The Chief Secretary for Administration Eric Chan said the Hong Kong government raised "strong objection to the association for its inability" to prevent the mistake from happening. Chief Executive John Lee said that the "song that was played was closely connected to the 2019 violence and disturbances, and advocacy for Hong Kong's independence," and said that the Organised Crime and Triad Bureau would investigate the matter. A man was later arrested in Hong Kong for thanking South Korea for playing the song.

In another incident, also in November 2022, when "March of the Volunteers" was played before a match in Dubai between the Hong Kong and Portugal rugby teams, the graphics on the screen said that the song's name was "Glory to Hong Kong".

A similar incident occurred three weeks later, on 2 December 2022, where the song was played at the prize giving ceremony at the Asian Classic Powerlifting Championship in Dubai. Hong Kong gold medallist Susanna Lin made a hand gesture to officials to stop the song from playing shortly after. The correct anthem, "March of the Volunteers", was played after just under two minutes delay.

Another incident occurred on 28 February 2022, where the song was played at an ice hockey match in Sarajevo. It was halted and the correct anthem was played after around 90 seconds. Several Hong Kong hockey players at the World Championship Division III Group B match made the “time out” gesture as the song was played following their victory over Iran.

Google 
In 2022, it is the top result of googling "Hong Kong national anthem" or "national anthem of Hong Kong". Secretary for Security Chris Tang appealed to Google to "correct" the search results to list March of the Volunteers instead, and said that the song being the top result hurt the feelings of Hong Kong people. Google refused the request from Tang. Chief Executive John Lee also said "It is a matter of whether a company acts responsibly and respects the importance of the national anthem in the global context."

See also
 "Do You Hear the People Sing?"
 "We Shall Overcome"
 "Sing Hallelujah to the Lord"
 "El pueblo unido jamás será vencido"
 Slava Ukraini

References

External links

 
 
 Official website (Cantonese)
 Resources released by composer (Cantonese)
 

2019–2020 Hong Kong protests
2019 songs
Asian anthems
Hong Kong songs
Political party songs
Protest songs
Songs about freedom
Slogans
Quotations from music
Songs about Hong Kong